Mountains of the Moon may refer to:

 Mountains of the Moon (Africa), a legendary mountain range once thought to be the source of the Nile River in Uganda
 Mountains of the Moon (film), a 1990 film about a search for the source of the Nile
 Mountains of the Moon University, Uganda
 List of mountains on the Moon, mountains on Luna
 Mountains of the Moon, or Chander Pahar, a 2013 Indian film
 "Mountains of the Moon", a 1969 song by the Grateful Dead from Aoxomoxoa
 Mountains of the Moon, the original working title for Mark Hollis's 1998 album Mark Hollis.
Mountain of the Moon, or Chander Pahar, a 1937 novel by Bibhutibhushan Bandopadhyay